Claxton High School is a public high school located in Claxton, Georgia, United States. It is a part of the Evans County School District. The current principal is Dr. Paul Mizell.
Between 1975 and 1979, students at the school under the direction of B. G. Tippins built and flew a biplane of unique design, the Claxton High School Lil' Rascal.

Student activities

Clubs and organizations
Student Advisory Committee
Student Council
Drama Club
Science Club
Math Club
FFA
Family, Career and Community Leaders of America
Future Business Leaders of America
Fellowship of Christian Athletes
Future Georgia Educators
4-H
Beta Club
Smart Partners Club
Spanish Club
Concert Band and Marching Band

Athletics

The school's athletic teams are known as the Claxton Tigers, and they compete in the Georgia High School Association's Region 3-A (Division A).
Tiger sports teams include:
Baseball
Basketball
Football
Golf
Softball
Tennis
Track and field

References

External links

Schools in Evans County, Georgia
Public high schools in Georgia (U.S. state)